Southbank Theatre is a performing arts venue located in the Southbank region of Melbourne, Victoria. It is the principal home of the Melbourne Theatre Company. The theatre was designed by ARM Architecture (Ashton Raggatt McDougall), and opened in January 2009 with a production of Poor Boy starring Guy Pearce.

The theatre is adjacent to the Melbourne Recital Centre venue on Southbank Boulevard, with the two buildings constructed simultaneously. The distinctive geometric shapes on the theatre's facade were inspired by the paintings of the American abstract expressionist artist Al Held.

The theatre contains two performance spaces: the 559-seat "Sumner", and the smaller "Lawler" with 150 seats. These were named after director John Sumner and playwright Ray Lawler respectively. The theatre is also home to Script Bar & Bistro, function rooms and foyers and two foyer bars.

References

External links
Melbourne Theatre Company website

Theatres in Melbourne
2009 establishments in Australia
Theatres completed in 2009
Buildings and structures in the City of Melbourne (LGA)
Southbank, Victoria